Picture communication symbols (PCS) are a set of colour and black & white drawings originally developed by Mayer-Johnson, LLC for use in augmentative and alternative communication (AAC) systems. These AAC systems may be high-tech (Dynamyte) or low-tech such as a communication board.

Symbols
Several studies have found PCS to be more transparent than other graphic symbols such as Blissymbols (Mizuko, 1987). A graphic symbol is transparent if "the shape, motion, or function of the referent is depicted to such an extent that meaning of the symbol can be readily guessed in the absence of the referent" (Fuller & Lloyd, 1991, p. 217).  Because of high transparency, PCS symbols are easy to learn by children with little or no speech. Several studies have reported that children with cognitive disabilities learn PCS easily. The communication interventions for individuals who have little or no speech have used PCS successfully for individuals.

The PCS set comprises a core library of roughly 5,000 symbols, supplemented by general-purpose addendum libraries and country-specific libraries for a total of 37,000+ symbols.  PCS symbols have been translated to 40 different languages.

People can develop their own PCS for certain needs or if the needed symbol is not available.  Some choose to start from scratch, and others start from alternative libraries.

Common uses for the PCS symbol set include speech therapy, picture schedules for people with Autism, and helping people facing limitations while hospitalized.

Boardmaker
A drawing program with PCS is called Boardmaker. The software was available for Macintosh and Microsoft Windows. It started around late 1980s or early 1990s.

There were many versions of Boardmaker for Mac & Win which include:

 Version 1 for Microsoft Windows (1994 - 2001)
 Version 3 for Macintosh (1991 - 2004)
 Version 5 for Microsoft Windows (2001-2007) and Macintosh (2004-2008)
 Version 6 for Microsoft Windows (2007-current) and Macintosh (2008-2020)
 Version 7 for Windows, Android, iOS (2020-current)

There are many different versions of Boardmaker such as:

 Boardmaker Plus
 Boardmaker with SD Pro
 Boardmaker Studio

References

 Fuller, D., & Lloyd, L. (1991). Toward a common usage of iconicity terminology. Augmentative and Alternative Communication, 7, 215–220.
 Mizuko, M. (1987). Transparency and ease of learning of symbols represented by Blissymbols, PCS, and Picsyms. Augmentative and Alternative Communication, 3, 129–136. in the 1800s.

External links
 AT Wiki on Assistivetech.net
 LessonPix Educational Clip Art
 Free Black and White Symbols from Do2Learn
 Free White on Black Symbols

Auxiliary and educational artificial scripts
Augmentative and alternative communication